Bernard R. "Ben" Schadler (March 9, 1924 – January 30, 2015) was an American professional basketball player. Schadler was selected in the 1947 BAA draft by the Chicago Stags after a collegiate career at Northwestern. He played for the Stags in the BAA followed by stints with the Detroit Vagabond Kings and Waterloo Hawks in the National Basketball League.

At Northwestern, Schadler played basketball, football, and baseball. He was also selected in the 1945 NFL Draft by the Detroit Lions (31st round, 321st overall) but never played in the National Football League.

BAA career statistics

Regular season

Playoffs

References

External links
Grandpa was a Baller – article about Schadler written by his grandson

1924 births
2015 deaths
Basketball players from Michigan
Chicago Stags draft picks
Chicago Stags players
Detroit Vagabond Kings players
Forwards (basketball)
Northwestern Wildcats baseball players
Northwestern Wildcats football players
Northwestern Wildcats men's basketball players
Waterloo Hawks players
American men's basketball players